Prague City University is an English-language private university in the Vinohrady district of Prague, Czech Republic, founded in 2004. Formerly known as Prague College, the university adopted its current name in 2021.

The university has two campuses, both located in the Prague 1 district. The college is organised around three Schools teaching approximately 550 students, and a research centre. About 35% of the students are Czech, and the rest come from around 80 countries around the world.

University profile 

Prague City University is a private university in Prague accredited by British bodies, including Teesside University, and Pearson Education. The college is also recognised by the Czech Ministry of Education as a branch of a foreign university in the Czech Republic.

The college also has a partnership with the Association of Chartered Certified Accountants (ACCA) and the Chartered Institute of Management Accountants (CIMA), and an industry network offering internships and employment to students and graduates.

The director and co-founder of the college is Canadian Douglas Hajek, who has been working in education in the Czech Republic since 1992. The college is managed by a senior management group and supported by an advisory board, consisting of:

 Ronald Barnett, Emeritus Professor of Higher Education at the Institute of Education in London
 Helena Sebkova, former director and researcher at the Centre for Higher Education Studies
 Bruce Sterling, an American science fiction author
 Minoru Kasuya, co-founder and former Chief Executive of the International Pacific College in New Zealand

Academics 

The college introduced its first qualifications in international business and web design in 2004. In 2005, it introduced Higher National Diplomas (HNDs) in cooperation with Edexcel, in business, graphic design, interactive media and computing. The first Bachelor's degree, a Bachelor of Arts (BA) in International Management, was introduced in 2008 in cooperation with Teesside University in the United Kingdom. 2009 saw the introduction of a BA (Hons) in Graphic Design, and the foundation of the research centre. In 2010, a Master of Science in International Management and a BA (Hons) in Fine Art (Experimental Media) were added to the curriculum. They were followed by a BSc (Hons) in Computing and a Foundation Diploma in Art and Design (2011), an MSc in Computing, professional and foundation diplomas in Business and Computing (2012) and a BA (Hons) in Applied Accounting and Business Finance (2013).

Prague City University undergraduate and postgraduate master's degrees are accredited and offered in cooperation with Teesside University, a British public university. The college's HNDs, Professional Diplomas and Foundation Diplomas are accredited by British Business and Technology Education Council (BTEC) qualifications awarded by Pearson plc.

School of Business

The School of Business is the largest of the college's three schools. It awards a Foundation Diploma in Business, a BA (Hons) in International Management, a BA (Hons) in International Finance and Business Accounting and an MSc in International Management. It also has Blended programmes for working professionals. The accounting and finance degrees earn students exemptions from the ACCA and CIMA professional qualifications.

School of Art & Design

The School of Art & Design awards a Foundation Diploma in Art and Design, an HND in Graphic Design, and a BA (Hons) in Graphic Design, and a BA (Hons) in Fine Art Experimental Media. It brings artists and designers to the school as part of the Visiting Artist and Lecture Series. Graduating art and design students showcase their work every year in a public exhibition.

School of Media & IT

The School of Media & IT offers two main areas of study. The first is related to computer science and covers programming, networks, security, database and web design, artificial intelligence, coding and algorithms, as well as an emphasis on digital media with a focus on game creation and multimedia application development. It awards a Professional Diploma in Computing, a BSc in Computing and an MSc in Computing. The second main area of study is on new and contemporary media practice, including journalism, film and radio, and multi-platform and convergent journalism. The degree awarded is BA (Hons) Creative Media Production.

Centre for Research and Interdisciplinary Study
The Centre for Research and Interdisciplinary Study (CRIS) is led by Dr Stefano Cavagnetto, Head of the School of Business, with the main aims of encouraging multidisciplinary research between fields.

CRIS's main areas research are: business ethics; finance, financial crime and governance; application of game theory to business; history of programming languages; ethics of virtual environments; history of cryptography; links between mathematics and art; cellular automata theory and applications; pattern theory and design; quality assurance and enhancement in transnational and international education; and aligning research to learning.

The college produces an academic journal, entitled CRIS - Bulletin for the Centre for Research and Interdisciplinary Study, which includes research from Prague College students and faculty and guest contributors. The journal is published by Versita, part of the Walter de Gruyter academic publishing group.

The college participates in Czech, European and international research and cultural projects, including conferences and workshops run by CRIS and the three Schools, and organises workshops, seminars and international guest speakers, including Darren Huston, Iva Pekárková, Bruce Sterling, Tomáš Sedláček, and Jaroslav Bašta.

Student body 
Prague City University's student body includes students from over 80 different countries, with about 35% being Czech. The student council comprises students from each of the college's three schools and of various nationalities. The council puts on events, organises social activities, raises money for charity and works with college management to improve student life at the college. The council also provides tutoring support and general support for new students.

Footnotes

External links
Prague City University website
Ministry of Education list of approved foreign universities in the Czech Republic
Teesside University list of external collaborative partners
A star Future

Educational institutions established in 2004
Educational institutions in Prague
Universities in the Czech Republic
2004 establishments in the Czech Republic